Nazlı is a Turkish feminine given name. "Naz" means 'beauty' which has a Persian root, and "lı" is a Turkish suffix meaning 'to have.'  It may refer to:

Given name
 Nazlı Çağla Dönertaş (born 1991), Turkish yachtracer
 Nazlı Deniz Kuruoğlu (born 1960), Turkish ballet dancer and former Miss Turkey winner
 Nazlı Ecevit (1900–1985), Turkish painter
 Nazlı Mengi (born 1988), Turkish singer
 Nazli Moawad, Egyptian political science professor
 Nazlı Sabri (1894–1978), queen consort of Egypt, of Turkish descent
 Nazlı Savranbaşı (born 2003), Turkish female artistic gymnast
 Nazlı Süleyman, Australian councillor
 Princess Nazli Fazl (1853–1913), Egyptian princess of Turkish descent
 Nazlı Nəcəfova (1908–1977), Azerbaijani pioneer in women's education
 Nazlı Tolga Brenninkmeyer (born 1979), Dutch journalist of Turkish descent

See also
 Nazilli, Turkish town said to be named after a woman called Nazlı

References

Turkish feminine given names
Turkish-language surnames